Dos Ojos (from Spanish meaning "Two Eyes"; officially Sistema Dos Ojos) is part of a flooded cave system located north of Tulum, on the Caribbean coast of the Yucatán Peninsula, in the state of Quintana Roo, Mexico. The exploration of Dos Ojos began in 1987 and still continues. In January 2018, a connection was found between Sistema Dos Ojos and Sistema Sac Actun. The smaller Dos Ojos became a part of Sac Actun, making the Sistema Sac Actun the longest known underwater cave system in the world.

Dos Ojos lies north of the rest of the Sac Actun cave system. As a separate system, Dos Ojos remained in the top ten, if not the top three, longest underwater cave systems in the world since the late 1980s. The deep passages include the "Wakulla Room", the "Beyond Main Base (BMB) passage", "Jill's room" and "The Next Generation passage". In August 2012 Dos Ojos was connected through a dry passage to Sistema Sac Actun. With March 2014 the total length of the combined system measures .

Dos Ojos is an anchialine cave system with connections to naturally intruding marine water and tidal influence in the cenotes. The coastal discharge point(s) of this cave system have not yet been humanly explored through to the ocean, although large volumes of groundwater were demonstrated by dye tracing to flow towards Caleta Xel-Ha, a nearby coastal bedrock lagoon.

The name Dos Ojos refers to two neighbouring cenotes that connect into a very large cavern zone shared between the two. These two cenotes appear like two large eyes into the underground. The original cave diving exploration of the whole cave system began through these cenotes. The  Dos Ojos underwater cave system was featured in a 2002 IMAX film, Journey Into Amazing Caves, and the 2006 BBC/Discovery Channel series Planet Earth. Parts of the Hollywood 2005 movie The Cave were filmed in the Dos Ojos cave system.

The water is exceptionally clear as a result of rainwater filtered through limestone, and there being very little soil development in this region since the limestone is very pure.

Fauna 

Tourism 
The Dos Ojos Cenotes are a popular snorkeling and cavern diving site receiving typically a hundred or more tourists per day. Most guided cavern dives include two dives in one day, each being 45 minutes long plus a 60-minute surface interval. It is possible to traverse underwater into another adjacent cenote called the "Bat Cave", which is also used for snorkeling. Visibility is excellent and generally limited by available light rather than water transparency.

Freediving Record 
On November 3, 2010, Dos Ojos hosted Carlos Coste's record-breaking freedive. Coste swam  on one breath and became the Guinness World Record holder for "Longest distance swam underwater with one breath (open water)".

See also

References 

 Steve Gerrard (2000). The Cenotes of the Riviera Maya. . online Version. Retrieved January 13, 2011.

External links 
 Sistema Dos Ojos Scuba Diving Guide
 Cenote dos Ojos
 Underwater Diving at Dos Ojos
Cenote Dos Ojos

 Dos Ojos
Caves of Mexico
Landforms of Quintana Roo
Limestone caves
Sinkholes of Mexico
Tulum (municipality)
Natural history of Quintana Roo
Tourist attractions in Quintana Roo
Underwater diving sites in Mexico